The Nether Edge Hospital was a health facility in Union Road, Sheffield, South Yorkshire, England. The main building, known as the Kingswood Building, remains a Grade II listed building.

History
The facility has its origins in the Ecclesall Bierlow Union Workhouse which was designed by William Flockton and opened in 1844. The dining hall and nurses' home were damaged by enemy bombing in December 1940 during the Second World War. It became Nether Edge Hospital in 1929 and joined the National Health Service in 1948. The main hospital closed in 1990 and most of the site was acquired by Gleeson Homes in 1997 and subsequently developed for residential use. Some of the newer buildings, located off Osborne Road, were retained by the NHS and amalgamated to form the Michael Carlisle Centre which was officially opened as a mental health facility by the Duchess of Gloucester in October 1999.

Gallery

References

Hospitals established in 1844
1844 establishments in England
Hospital buildings completed in 1844
Hospitals in Sheffield
Defunct hospitals in England